Resurrection is the sixth studio album by American recording artist Anastacia released in May 2014. The record is her first album of original material in nearly five and a half years and was recorded primarily written during Anastacia's second battle with breast cancer. The album proved to a commercial success in Europe entering the top five in Italy, Germany, Spain and Switzerland and the top ten in the Dutch and UK charts.

Background

The album's title Resurrection refers to the artist's recovery from breast cancer and a return to the "sprock" sound (hybrid of soul, pop and rock) the singer became known for in 2004. The recording sessions for the album began in early 2013. The title also refers to the meaning of her name in Greek, Anastasia. During the recording of the song "Pendulum" she was informed of her second cancer diagnosis. 

The lead single "Stupid Little Things" was written by Sam Watters and Louis Biancaniello, with whom she has had a long-standing collaborative partnership. The song received a positive reception with MTV's Brad Stern including it in his 5 Must-Hear Pop Songs of the Week!. For the album also continued working with the producer and songwriter Jamie Hartman, including the song "Stay" that refers to her personal circumstances at the time. Other collaborators included the musician John Fields, producer Toby Gadd and songwriter Steve Diamond.

She wrote the song "Pendulum" of her divorce from Wayne Newton in 2007, saying: "It's totally about the loss of my marriage, but it's a beautiful song. I think I lost a bit of myself for a while. My career got so busy I'd be thinking: 'Who the hell I am?'"

The deluxe edition in a hardback book format contains a second CD with four additional tracks that includes "Left Outside Alone, Part 2" – a re-recording of a previous hit single.

Promotion
Anastacia embarked on a European promotional tour in support of "Stupid Little Things". At the start of October 2014, she embarked on her third headlining tour, the Resurrection Tour. A second single "Staring at the Sun" appeared in September of the same year, while the radio-only single "Lifeline" was released in Italy.

Track listing

Charts

Weekly charts

Year-end charts

References

2014 albums
Anastacia albums